The Ningxia Library, also known as the Library of Ningxia Hui Autonomous Region, is a large scale comprehensive research-oriented public library, located in Jinfeng District, Yinchuan City. The library was founded in 1958.

History
In August 2008, the New Hall of Ningxia Library was opened with an investment of 260 million yuan and a building area of more than 33,000 square meters.

References

Buildings and structures in Ningxia
Libraries established in 1958